The Stimulus Package is a collaborative studio album by Philadelphia rapper Freeway and Seattle producer Jake One. It was released on Minneapolis indie hip hop label Rhymesayers Entertainment on February 16, 2010. The album included two singles, "Know What I Mean" and "She Makes Me Feel Alright", both of which have had videos made for them. The package was designed by Brent Rollins of the ego trip collective. The album debuted at number 63 on the Billboard 200, selling over 9,000 units in its first week.

Freeway and Jake One are working on a sequel to the project.

Critical reception
The Stimulus Package has received generally favorable reviews from critics. Metacritic gave the album a score of 78/100, based on 15 reviews.

AllMusic included it on their "Favorite Rap/Hip-Hop Albums of 2010" list, while DJ Premier listed it as one of his favorite 25 albums of 2010.

Track listing

All tracks are produced by Jake One.

Samples 

 "Throw Your Hands Up" contain an interpolation of "Passin' Me By", as performed by The Pharcyde.
 "One Foot In" contain a sample of "Can You Still Love Me", as performed by Ohio Players.
 "Never Gonna Change" contain an interpolation of 'Row, Row, Row Your Boat".
 "Know What I Mean" contain a sample of "Feelin' Good", as performed by Clara Ward.
 "The Product" contain a sample of "Cirkus", as performed by King Crimson.

Charts

References

External links
 

2010 albums
Freeway (rapper) albums
Albums produced by Jake One
Rhymesayers Entertainment albums
Collaborative albums